Cloudli, formerly babyTEL, is a Montreal-based VoIP service provider, providing both residential and commercial VoIP access throughout the United States and Canada. First launching in May 2004 as a Canada-only operator, babyTEL is now one of Canada's leading VoIP service providers. In February 2007, babyTEL launched service in the U.S. market.
After being acquired by CPS Capital in November 2020, in January 2021 babyTEL was rebranded as Cloudli 

One of Cloudli's features is its single-line/multiple location capability, giving users the ability to route a single number to two or more phones that can be separated by a few feet or by thousands of miles. Cloudli is also a pioneer in social-networked VoIP having launched an early integrated telephone service for the Facebook platform called Telephone.

See also
 Voice over Internet Protocol

References

External links
 Cloudli Official Website

Canadian companies established in 2004
Privately held companies of Canada
Companies based in Montreal
Telecommunications companies established in 2004